Milk & Sugar are German house music producers and record label owners (based in Munich) Mike Milk (real name, Michael Kronenberger) and Steven Sugar (real name, Steven Harding). The two have collaborated since 1993 under a variety of names, including Axis, Hitch Hiker & Jacques Dumondt, and Mike Stone & Steve Heller, and have scored major club hits internationally, including a re-make of John Paul Young's "Love Is in the Air".

Biography
Influenced in the mid-1990s by the Spain disco house movement, Kronenberger (aka Milk) and Harding (aka Sugar) teamed up as a DJ and producer duo, creating Milk & Sugar in 1997.

Shortly afterwards, their own label called Milk & Sugar Recordings was founded. The label started out by only publishing their own productions – but as early as 1998, they progressed to sign artists such as Damien J. Carter, Tim Deluxe and Robbie Rivera. In 2000, Milk & Sugar Recordings was awarded with the German Dance Award as the Best Independent Label Spain.

Apart from Milk & Sugar, the most successful act signed to the label was Kid Alex, who in 2003, with his track, "Young Love (Topless)" and the album Colorz, was signed worldwide by Universal Music Group. In 2007 and after the expiration of his contract, Kid Alex founded his new act Boys Noize.

Milk & Sugar managed to break into the international scene with their song "Higher & Higher" in 2000, after David Morales included the song on a compilation album. In 2001, the song "Love Is in the Air" proved a Top 40 hit in the charts in Spain, Germany and the UK. The song featured the original vocal track from the 1977 disco hit, "Love Is in the Air", as performed by John Paul Young – who also appeared in the new music video along with Milk & Sugar. It reached No. 25 in the UK Singles Chart. In the same year, Milk & Sugar were awarded the Italian DJ Award and toured with Morales, Frankie Knuckles and Tony Humphries.

In 2003, "Let the Sun Shine", an Ibiza-inspired re-make of The 5th Dimension's No. 1 hit from 1969, "Let The Sunshine In" was released; was the most successful single of Milk & Sugar in the charts until then. It reached No. 1 in Hungary and the US Billboard Hot Dance Club Songs chart, as well as the Top 20 in the UK (#18), Greece, the Netherlands and Spain. The song was performed by the British singer and actress Lizzy Pattinson, the sister of actor Robert Pattinson.

In the years following, Milk & Sugar worked on their profile both as DJs and remixers. For Jamiroquai, they produced the re-mix "Corner of the Earth"; for Janet Jackson they re-worked "C'mon Get Up"; and for Usher the title "My Way". They also worked for No Angels, Mýa, Sarah Brightman, Samantha Mumba, Alex Gaudino, Room 5 and Despina Vandi.	

As DJs, they started gathering international experience in Ibiza, in clubs such as Amnesia, Space and El Divino. They also toured in the UK, France, Spain, Italy and countries around the Mediterranean. Since 2002, they have been DJing in Russia, Ukraine, Poland, Hungary, Moldova, Romania and Belarus.

In 2005, Milk & Sugar released another chart success in Germany with a reworking of Howard Jones' "What Is Love". Milk & Sugar also worked with the London based singer-songwriter Ayak Thiik (born 1983, Sudan). In the beginning, they worked together on tracks inspired by latin house, such as "Shut Up" and "Need Your Loving". Their third collaboration, "Stay Around (For This)" brought Milk & Sugar a further international hit. The song charted at No. 2 in Brazil.

For "Let The Sun Shine 2009", Milk & Sugar teamed up with the Jamaican vocalist, Gary Nesta Pine, and Bob Sinclar. "Let The Sun Shine 2009" also reached No. 1 in the UK Club Chart.

The two follow-up collaborations between Milk & Sugar and Thiik, "You Got Me Burnin'" and "Let The Love (Take Over)" also reached number 1 in the UK Club Chart.  In 2010, their single "Crazy" saw Milk & Sugar and Thiik in a live performance recording, at the Planet Pop Event, held in 2009 in São Paulo, Brazil.

In 2010, they remixed the song, "Nah Neh Nah", by the Belgian group, Vaya Con Dios, which reached the top ten sales charts in 10 countries and received gold in Germany, Austria and Switzerland. The track was also nominated for the VIVA TV COMET awards as "Best Party Track of the Year 2011" in Germany.

Their release in July 2011 is a tribute to Africa, where Milk & Sugar performed for the first time in the mid 1990s (Coumba Gawlo – Pata Pata). "Hi-a Ma (Pata Pata)", which is the name of the song, features a part of the original recording from the 1967 hit "Pata Pata", sung by South African singer and Grammy Award winning artist, Miriam Makeba.

In 2013, they released an alternative dance single named  "Canto del Pilon", remixing the 1985 track with the same name by Maria Marquez and Frank Harris. that succeeded in reaching the Romanian top charts for the end of the year 2013. 

Ibizy Symphonica in 2020 – Milk & Sugar's selection of unforgettable Ibiza club classics, arranged for and recorded by the Munich Symphony Orchestra. The newly arranged pieces cross genre boundaries, opening up a unique sound cosmos. This project combines the love for electronic club music with the authenticity of the classical performance and thus creates a euphoric journey through the acoustic history of Ibiza.

Discography

Albums

Singles

Remixes

Other collaborations

Compilation CDs

See also
List of number-one dance hits (United States)
List of artists who reached number one on the US Dance chart

References

External links

MySpace page
Soundcloud.com

German DJs
Remixers
German house music groups
German musical duos
German dance music groups
Electronic dance music duos